The Cutter is a compilation album of Echo & the Bunnymen songs, which was released in 1993.

Track listing 
All tracks written by Ian McCulloch, Will Sergeant, Les Pattinson and Pete de Freitas except where noted.

 "The Cutter" – 3:56
 "Bombers Bay" – 4:23
 "Paint it Black" (live) (Jagger/Richards) – 3:13
 "All You Need is Love" (Lennon–McCartney) – 6:43
 "Ashes to Ashes" (aka "Stars Are Stars") – 2:46
 "All My Life" – 4:09
 "A Promise" – 3:40
 "Read It in Books" (McCulloch, Julian Cope) – 2:32
 "Crocodiles" – 2:37
 "Crystal Days" – 2:26
 "Ocean Rain" – 5:10
 "My Kingdom" – 4:04

Personnel 
 Ian McCulloch – guitar, vocals
 Will Sergeant – guitar
 Les Pattinson – bass, drums
 Pete de Freitas – drums

References 

 
 

Echo & the Bunnymen compilation albums
1993 compilation albums